From the Big Apple to the Big Easy were New York City's benefit concerts for the Gulf Coast. The purpose was to raise funds for the Hurricane Katrina relief efforts. The Big Easy is a nickname for New Orleans and the Big Apple is a nickname for New York City.

The simultaneous concerts took place on September 20, 2005.  Proceeds have reached approximately $9 million, which was directed to the Bush Clinton Katrina Fund, Habitat for Humanity, MusiCares, and the Children's Health Fund.

Performers included Jimmy Buffett, Ed Bradley, Irma Thomas, Bette Midler, Elton John, Elvis Costello, John Fogerty, Simon and Garfunkel and Ry Cooder.

References

Other sources
 Star-Studded Katrina Benefit Heading To DVD | Billboard
 Big Apple to the Big Easy Rocks Katrina - Glide Magazine 
From the Big Apple to the Big Easy: The Concert for New Orleans, A review of the DVD release of the concert
Public Affairs
Rolling Stones
Star Pulse 
CNN
Entertainment Weekly

External links
Official website, via Wayback Machine (December 2005 edition of website)

Hurricane Katrina disaster relief benefit concerts
2005 in music
2005 in New York City